François Dumont may refer to:

François Dumont (sculptor) (1688–1729), French sculptor
François Dumont (painter) (1751–1831), French painter of portrait miniatures
François Dumont (pianist) (born 1985), French classical pianist